Michael E. Fourney is an American registered professional engineer and professor.

Education 
Fourney earned his BS in aeronautical engineering from West Virginia University in 1958. He received his MS in 1960 and PhD in 1963 at the California Institute of Technology working with Albert T. Ellis.

Research and career 
After graduate school Fourney took a position at the University of  Washington.  He moved to the University of California, Los Angeles in 1972 holding positions of professor, department chair and chair of the faculty.  His work in applied solids and fluid mechanics topics utilized a wide range of optical techniques. Since retiring in 1994, he has held the position of professor emeritus in civil and environmental engineering at the University of California, Los Angeles and also runs Fourney Eng., Inc.. He was active in the Society for Experimental Stress Analysis and later renamed Society for Experimental Mechanics, serving as president from 1980 to 1981. Fourney was named an Honorary Member of the Society for Experimental Mechanics in 2001. He been very active and supportive of the SEM Educational Foundation.

Awards and recognition 
Society for Experimental Mechanics Lazan (1975)
Society for Experimental Mechanics Fellow (1984)
American Society of Mechanical Engineers Fellow (1987)
SEM Murray Lecture and Award (1990)
Society for Experimental Mechanics Tatnall (1996)
Society for Experimental Mechanics Honorary Member (2001)
Society for Experimental Mechanics Taylor (2004)
American Academy of Mechanics Fellow

References 

1936 births
American engineers
California Institute of Technology alumni
West Virginia University alumni
University of California, Los Angeles
Fellows of the Society for Experimental Mechanics
20th-century American engineers
Living people